The salinon (meaning 'salt-cellar' in Greek) is a geometrical figure that consists of four semicircles. It was first introduced in the Book of Lemmas, a work attributed to Archimedes.

Construction
Let A, D, E, and B be four points on a line in the plane, in that order, with AD = EB. Let O be the bisector of segment AB (and of DE). A salinon is the figure bounded by these four semicircles.

Properties

Area
Archimedes introduced the salinon in his Book of Lemmas by applying Book II, Proposition 10 of Euclid's Elements. Archimedes noted that "the area of the figure bounded by the circumferences of all the semicircles [is] equal to the area of the circle on CF as diameter."

Arbelos

Should points D and E converge with O, it would form an arbelos, another one of Archimedes' creations, with symmetry along the y-axis.

See also

 Lune of Hippocrates

References

External links
L’arbelos. Partie II by Hamza Khelif at www.images.math.cnrs.fr of CNRS

Piecewise-circular curves
Archimedes